James Ryan Hayes (November 21, 1989 – August 23, 2021) was an American professional ice hockey right winger. He was selected by the Toronto Maple Leafs in the second round, 60th overall, of the 2008 NHL Entry Draft and played in the National Hockey League (NHL) with the Chicago Blackhawks, Florida Panthers, Boston Bruins, and the New Jersey Devils. His younger brother Kevin Hayes is also a professional ice hockey player.

Playing career

Amateur
In 2005–06, Hayes was a member of the U.S. National U-17 Team at the 2005 Four Nations Tournament, hosted in Russia. He was then selected to the 2006 U.S. U-17 Select Team and participated at the U-18 Ivan Hlinka Memorial Tournament hosted in the Czech Republic. He was selected first overall in the 2006 USHL Futures Draft by the Ohio Junior Blue Jackets.

In 2006–07, Hayes played for the USA Hockey National Team Development Program (NTDP)'s under-18 team, and was also a member of the silver medal-winning Team USA at the 2007 IIHF World U18 Championships, hosted in Finland.

The 2007–08 season marked Hayes' second season with the NTDP. In 18 games with the U18 team, he tallied seven points, and in 19 games with the U.S. National Team, he tallied ten points. In February 2008, Hayes had his United States Hockey League (USHL) rights traded from the Ohio Jr. Blue Jackets to the Lincoln Stars. Shortly after, he was released from the NTDP and joined the Stars. He played with Lincoln for 21 games, scoring four goals and 11 assists, also registering nine post-season from eight games. In the Fall of 2008, Hayes signed a letter of intent to attend Boston College of the NCAA's Hockey East conference. He was selected by the Toronto Maple Leafs in the second round, 60th overall, of the 2008 NHL Entry Draft.

In his three-year, 117-game tenure with the Boston College Eagles, Hayes tallied a total of 81 points (42 goals and 39 assists). As a freshman in the 2008–09 season, Hayes played in 36 games and registered 13 points (eight goals and five assists). Of the eight goals, one was a game-winning goal, one was a power play goal, and one was a shorthanded goal. At the end of the season, Hayes ranked fifth on the team with 75 shots. He is also noted to have recorded two multiple-goal games, including one hat trick.

As a sophomore in the 2009–10 season, Hayes played in all 42 of Boston College's games. During that time, he registered 35 points (13 goals and 22 assists). He is also credited with three power play goals, three game-winning goals, and a +7 plus-minus rating. Hayes had nine multi-point games during the season, including one four-point outing and one three-point night. Hayes' effort during the post-season helped to lift the Eagles over the University of Maine in a 7–6 overtime victory during the Hockey East championship game on March 20. Hayes and the Eagles won the 2010 NCAA Division I Men's Ice Hockey Tournament in Detroit at Ford Field.

Professional
On June 26, 2010, the Toronto Maple Leafs traded Hayes to the Chicago Blackhawks in exchange for the 43rd overall selection in the 2010 NHL Entry Draft (Bradley Ross).

Hayes made his NHL debut against the Detroit Red Wings on December 30, 2011. He scored his first NHL goal on January 2, 2012, in his second career game, against Devan Dubnyk of the Edmonton Oilers. Hayes scored his second goal on January 5, 2012, in this third career game against Ilya Bryzgalov of the Philadelphia Flyers.

During the 2013–14 season, on November 14, 2013, Hayes was traded, along with Dylan Olsen, to the Florida Panthers in exchange for Kris Versteeg and Philippe Lefebvre. On July 29, 2014, Hayes and the Panthers agreed to a one-year, one-way contract for $925,000. In the 2014–15 season, Hayes played his first full season in the NHL with the Panthers, notching a career high 19 goals and 35 points in 72 games.

As a restricted free agent, on July 1, 2015, the Panthers traded Hayes to the Boston Bruins in exchange for Reilly Smith and the contract of injured Marc Savard. On July 6, 2015, Hayes agreed to terms on a three-year contract with the Bruins worth $2.3 million per year. Hayes' first goal as a Bruin came on October 14, 2015, in a 6–2 road victory against the hosting Colorado Avalanche. Just over two months later, in the second game of a home-on-home series against the Ottawa Senators, Hayes scored his first-ever NHL hat trick against Senators' goaltender Craig Anderson, as the initial, fifth and seventh Bruins goals (the seventh scored with only 0.2 seconds of game time remaining) for a 7–3 home ice Bruins win.

On June 30, 2017, after a career-worst season (2 goals, 5 points in 58 games) in 2016–17, Hayes was bought out from the remaining year of his contract by the Bruins.

On October 1, 2017, Hayes signed a one-year, one-way contract with the New Jersey Devils. In and out of the lineup, Hayes had three goals and six assists in 33 games.

On July 1, 2018, Hayes signed a one-year, two-way contract with the Pittsburgh Penguins. While participating at the Penguins training camp prior to the 2018–19 season, Hayes was reassigned to their AHL affiliate, the Wilkes-Barre/Scranton Penguins.

Personal life
Hayes, along with his brother Kevin, was a cousin of former NHL players Tom Fitzgerald and Keith Tkachuk, as well as Tkachuk's sons Matthew and Brady, and Fitzgerald's sons Ryan, who was drafted by the Boston Bruins, and Casey, a Buffalo Sabres prospect.

After his retirement, Hayes started the podcast Missin Curfew with fellow former players Shane O'Brien and Scottie Upshall.

Hayes was found dead at the age of 31 at his Milton, Massachusetts, home on August 23, 2021. A toxicology report later determined fentanyl and cocaine use contributed to his death. He is survived by his wife and two sons.

Career statistics

Regular season and playoffs

International

References

External links
 

1989 births
2021 deaths
American men's ice hockey right wingers
Binghamton Devils players
Boston Bruins players
Boston College Eagles men's ice hockey players
Chicago Blackhawks players
Florida Panthers players
Ice hockey people from Boston
Lincoln Stars players
New Jersey Devils players
Rockford IceHogs (AHL) players
Toronto Maple Leafs draft picks
USA Hockey National Team Development Program players
Wilkes-Barre/Scranton Penguins players